Thomas Michael Fitzgerald (28 August 1918 – 25 January 1993) was an Australian economist, journalist and political advisor.

Education
Fitzgerald trained in economics by reading Keynes at the University of Sydney (1936–40).

Career
Fitzgerald enlisted in the Royal Australian Air Force in November 1942 and, after training, was navigator on 'Liberator' bombers in 1944–45.

Fitzgerald was financial editor of The Sydney Morning Herald from 1952 to 1970. While retaining his employment by Fairfax, he began publishing Nation, a fortnightly journal, in September 1958. Sylvia Lawson was one of his early contributors. He sold Nation to Gordon Barton in 1972 and was Editorial Director of Rupert Murdoch's News Ltd from 1970 to 1972.

Fitzgerald produced the "Fitzgerald Report – The contribution of the mineral industry to Australian welfare : report to the Minister for Minerals and Energy" (1974) for the Whitlam Government.

In 1990 Fitzgerald delivered a set of six Boyer Lectures "Between Life and Economics – 'A dissenting case'".

Personal 
Fitzgerald died in St Vincent's Hospital, Darlinghurst on 25 January 1993. He was survived by his wife, whom he had married in 1945, and their two sons and two daughters.

References

External links

1918 births
1993 deaths
Royal Australian Air Force personnel of World War II
People from Marrickville
University of Sydney alumni
20th-century  Australian  economists
20th-century Australian journalists
Royal Australian Air Force officers
The Sydney Morning Herald people